KIEV-LP, a low-power radio station licensed to serve Camas, Washington, United States. It formerly held the call sign KCVD-LP from 2014 to 2015. The station is owned by Outlaw Music Association.

KIEV-LP plays primarily classic country music, and is called "Outlaw Country Radio", "1025 The Outlaw" or "Outlaw FM."

References

External links
 Official website
 

IEV-LP
IEV-LP
Radio stations established in 2014
2014 establishments in Washington (state)
Classic country radio stations in the United States